Clifford's Inn is a former Inn of Chancery in London. It was located between Fetter Lane, Clifford's Inn Passage, leading off Fleet Street and Chancery Lane in the City of London. The Inn was founded in 1344 and refounded 15 June 1668. It was dissolved in 1903, and most of its original structure was demolished in 1934. It was both the first Inn of Chancery to be founded and the last to be demolished.

Through the ages, Clifford's Inn was engaged in educating students in jurisprudence, Edward Coke and John Selden being two of its best known alumni. It also accommodated graduates preparing for ordination, such as the novelist Samuel Butler and those studying for other professions. In 1903, the members of Clifford's Inn reached the view that the establishment had outlived its purpose in education, and unanimously voted to dissolve its incorporation. Its remaining funds were donated to the Attorney General for England and Wales.

Since then, Clifford's Inn has housed offices, such as The Senior Courts Costs Office. In apartments above, Virginia Woolf, Sir John Stuttard (679th Lord Mayor) and Sir Ernest Ryder (High Court Judge) have been residents.

History

The Inns of Chancery appear to have evolved in tandem with the Inns of Court. During the 12th and 13th centuries the Law was taught in the City of London primarily by the clergy.

However, during the 13th century two events happened which diminished this form of legal education: firstly, a decree by Henry III of England stating that no institutes of legal education could exist in the City of London; and, secondly, a Papal Bull prohibiting clergy from teaching law in London.

Consequently, the system of legal education dispersed, with lawyers instead settling on the outskirts of the City of London but as close as possible to Westminster Hall, where the signing of the Magna Carta led to the establishment of a permanent court.

The neighbourhood of what had been the small village of Holborn evolved into habitations, i.e. "hostels" or "inns", which over time became known by the name of their respective landlords.

Inns of Chancery developed around the Inns of Court, establishing their name and ultimate purpose from the Chancery Clerks, who used these buildings not only as accommodation, but as offices from where to draft their writs. Since the Middle Ages, education at one of these Inns has been considered the customary step to becoming a barrister. Therefore, a student or pupil entered one of the Inns of Chancery, where he would be taught in the latest form of moots and rote learning.

The land on which Clifford's Inn remains situated was granted to Lord de Clifford on 24 February 1310, and it is from his family that the Inn derives its name. Upon Lord de Clifford's death in 1314 his estates passed via his brother, Roger, to his nephew, Robert de Clifford, 3rd Baron de Clifford after whose death in 1344, his widow (Isabel, Lady de Clifford) granted use of the land to students of the law for £10 annually. It was the first recorded Inn of Chancery, although its official date of incorporation is not known.

The Society of Clifford's Inn concluded purchase of the freehold of the property on 29 March 1618 from its then owner, Francis Clifford, 4th Earl of Cumberland, for the sum of £600, with the proviso that it should pay him £4 per year rent thereafter for use of the land and to keep a set of chambers available for those barristers of his choosing.

On the death of the 5th Earl, the earldom of Cumberland became extinct and the barony of Clifford (cr. by writ 1628) passed to his daughter and sole heiress, Lady Elizabeth Boyle, Countess of Thanet. After protracted family legal wranglings the rights and privileges to Clifford's Inn (together with the title of Hereditary Sheriff of Westmorland) devolved upon his cousin, Lady Anne Clifford (de jure Baroness de Clifford), which estates remained with her descendants until the early 19th century.

By 1903 it was apparent that the Inn was superfluous to requirements of legal education, so its members unanimously agreed to dissolve the society, selling the buildings and giving its residue to the Attorney General for England and Wales, the nominal head of the Bar, to do with it as it so wished. The auction of the assets took place on 14 May of that year (i.e. 1903), and the Inn was sold "at a ridiculously low price", in the sum of £100,000. The buildings of the Inn were later demolished in 1934, save its gatehouse (at Clifford's Inn Passage), which survives to this day. This gatehouse is believed to have been designed by Decimus Burton, a student of the Inn from 1830 to 1834.

Governance and structure
Clifford's Inn was ruled by its council, which was led by a Principal. As well as the Principal, the Council consisted of twelve barristers, all elected by the Inn members and who enjoyed certain rights; they could hold chambers whenever they wanted and sat at a separate upper table to dine. The Principal was elected by the entire Inn's membership and was tasked with overseeing its day-to-day running and supervision of the Inn's servants; his privileges included the right to choose from any one of 18 sets of chambers and a generous allowance for beer. Principals were originally elected for life, but subsequent to a council order dated 15 June 1668 they were subject to re-election every three years. However, between 1668 and the last election in 1890, only 21 men served as Principal of Clifford's Inn, since "once elected, always elected" unless infirm became customary practice.

The Clifford family's protracted title dispute caused confusion in Clifford's Inn governance for some time, and during this period usage of a differenced coat of arms is recorded: "Chequée Or and Azure, a Fess Gules, a Bordure bezantée of the Third". Clifford's Inn later resumed its (or adopted) usage of the ancient Clifford arms, namely: "Chequée Or and Azure, a Fess Gules".

Noted students in the law at Clifford's Inn include Sir Edward Coke and John Selden. Although generally considered to be an adjunct to the Inner Temple, the members of Clifford's Inn always maintained that they were a separate entity. As a mark of that "independence" the Inner Temple benchers began a tradition of sending Clifford's Inn a message once a year, to which of course a reply was neither likely nor expected!

See also
 Inns of Chancery
 List of demolished buildings and structures in London

References

Bibliography

External links

 www.innertemple.org.uk
 www.oldandsold.com
 www.britishlistedbuildings.co.uk

History of the City of London
1344 establishments in England
1903 disestablishments in England
Former buildings and structures in the City of London
Inns of Chancery
Legal buildings in London
Demolished buildings and structures in London
Buildings and structures demolished in 1934